Dimethyl trithiocarbonate is an organic compound with the chemical formula . It is a methyl ester of trithiocarbonic acid. This chemical belongs to a subcategory of esters called thioesters. It is a sulfur analog of dimethyl carbonate , where all three oxygen atoms are replaced with sulfur atoms. In terms of its name, dimethyl trithiocarbonate is derived from esterification of trithiocarbonic acid with methanethiol.

Properties
Dimethyl trithiocarbonate is a yellow liquid with a strong and very unpleasant smell.

Uses

Dimethyl trithiocarbonate is used in preparation of methyl-β,β′-dicarbonyldithiocarboxylate derivatives, in generation of tris(organothiyl)methyl radicals , and in preparation of β-oxodithiocarboxylates. Dimethyl trithiocarbonate is also a useful reagent in the preparation of 2-mercaptoquinoline and its analogues which are potential antileishmanial agents.

Hazards and toxicity
Dimethyl trithiocarbonate is combustible. Upon catching fire, irritating, suffocating and toxic gases are released, like carbon oxides and sulfur oxides.

References 

Methyl esters